Yuri Vlasov may refer to:

 Yury Vlasov (1935–2021), Soviet weightlifter and Russian politician
 Yuriy Vlasov (born 1970), Ukrainian freestyle swimmer
 Yurii Vlasov (born 1964), Russian-American engineer and scientist
 Yury Vlasov (politician) (1961–2019), Russian politician, first governor of Vladimir Oblast